The Volunteers of America Classic is a women's professional golf tournament in Texas on the LPGA Tour. It debuted in April 2013 at Las Colinas Country Club in Irving, northwest of downtown Dallas.

Volunteers of America, the title sponsor, is a faith-based nonprofit organization that provides affordable housing and other assistance, primarily to low-income people, throughout the United States.

Inbee Park won the inaugural event, one stroke ahead of Carlota Ciganda, and became its first multiple winner in 2015. In between, Stacy Lewis won by six strokes in 2014 and set the tournament record at 268 (−16).

In 2018, the tournament moved north to the Old American Golf Club in The Colony, along Lewisville Lake.

Tournament names
2013–2014: North Texas LPGA Shootout
2015: Volunteers of America North Texas Shootout Presented by JTBC
2016–2017: Volunteers of America Texas Shootout Presented by JTBC
2018: Volunteers of America LPGA Texas Classic
2019–2021: Volunteers of America Classic
2022-present: The Ascendant LPGA benefitting Volunteers of America

Winners

Tournament records

References

External links

Coverage on LPGA Tour official site
Old American Golf Club
Las Colinas Country Club – former host

LPGA Tour events
Golf in Texas
Sports in Irving, Texas
Recurring sporting events established in 2013
2013 establishments in Texas
Women's sports in Texas